Shahrak-e Ansar (also Romanized as Shahrak-e Anşār) is a village in Howmeh Rural District, in the Central District of Andimeshk County, Khuzestan Province, Iran. At the 2006 census, its population was 88, composed of fourteen families.

References 

Populated places in Andimeshk County